Steve Arlen Henry (March 5, 1957 – March 18, 2021) was an American former professional football defensive back who played in the National Football League (NFL) from 1979 to 1981 for the St. Louis Cardinals, New York Giants and Baltimore Colts. Henry played in a total of 15 career games. He was killed in Emporia, Kansas by a reckless driver, who was fleeing police.

References

2021 deaths
1957 births
St. Louis Cardinals (football) players
New York Giants players
Baltimore Colts players
American football defensive backs
Emporia State Hornets football players
Road incident deaths in Kansas